Avenir Aleksandrovich Yakovkin (Авенир Александрович Яковкин) (1887–1974) was a Russian astronomer.

From 1928 to 1931 he served as director of the V. P. Engel'gardt Astronomical Observatory at Kazan University.

The crater Yakovkin on the Moon is named after him.

External links
  biography

Russian astronomers
1887 births
1974 deaths